Magdalena Zawadzka (born 29 October 1944) is a Polish stage and film actress. She is the wife of actor Gustaw Holoubek and the mother of cinematographer Jan Holoubek. She gained wide popularity after the 1968 film Colonel Wolodyjowski (Pan Wołodyjowski), in which she played the role of Basia Wołodyjowska.

Her cousin is Australian actress Magda Szubanski.

Notable film roles includes Mazepa (1976), Na dobre i na złe TV series (2002), Ryś (2007), Magda M. TV series (Season 4, 2007).

References

External links
 

1944 births
Living people
Polish film actresses
Polish stage actresses
Polish television actresses
People from Kraków County
20th-century Polish actresses
21st-century Polish actresses
Recipient of the Meritorious Activist of Culture badge